Isaac Allen Jack (26 June 1843 – 5 April 1903) was a Canadian lawyer and author.

External links

1843 births
1903 deaths
Lawyers in New Brunswick
Canadian non-fiction writers
Writers from New Brunswick